From the Basement is a web television series created by Nigel Godrich and producer Dilly Gent. It features live music performances by artists in a studio environment without a host or audience.

Development
In September 2006, it was announced that Godrich, along with producer Dilly Gent, producer James Chads and John Woollcombe were shooting the music series From the Basement, filmed from London's Maida Vale Studios.

Godrich took inspiration from The Old Grey Whistle Test, a BBC music television series that broadcast in the 1970s and 1980s, and the 1996 concert film Rock and Roll Circus, which documents concerts by the Rolling Stones and other acts. He told Pitchfork: "[It was amazing] to see such a snapshot of that time: you get to see [the musicians], warts and all... [We were] just saying what a shame it was that there wasn't anything that really felt as honest as that any more."

Godrich conceived From the Basement to capture "the true representation" of the artists' work without the pressure of television promotion or interference from presenters and audiences. He wrote that he wanted to make "bands as comfortable as possible so that they can give great performances without the usual agony of TV promo which everyone has to do but no one seems to enjoy."

Godrich produced the From the Basement pilot as an internet-only show, but needed more funding to produce a series. The show received additional funding from Sky Arts in the UK and Rave and IFC in the USA.

Broadcast
The podcast launched on 18 December 2006. The first UK broadcast was on Sky Arts on 1 December 2007 and premiered in the US on Rave HD on 22 February 2008, followed by a run on the Independent Film Channel in the fall of 2008. The IFC chose to split the episodes listed below into shorter, half-hour segments.

They were also amongst the final programmes broadcast by the now defunct YLE Extra in Finland.

A second series of shows ran on Sky Arts from 3 December 2008 to 7 January 2009. On 10 March 2009 the series of performances was released on DVD. A new series of From the Basement began on YouTube in May 2022, featuring acts including Idles, Warpaint and Caribou.

Episodes
Each episode of From The Basement features performances from several musical artists. The first podcast episode of the series featured Thom Yorke performing songs from the Radiohead album In Rainbows (2007), the White Stripes, and a collaboration between Four Tet's Kieran Hebden and drummer Steve Reid. The episode was filmed by director Sophie Muller. Episode 6 of series 1 was filmed in Bob Clearmountain's Berkeley Street Studio in Los Angeles rather than in London's Maida Vale Studios. There are also two full episodes of Radiohead performances, released as In Rainbows – From the Basement (2008) and The King of Limbs: Live from the Basement (2011).

Pilot

Series 1

Series 2

See also
 Music podcast

References

External links

YouTube channel

2006 British television series debuts
2009 British television series endings
2000s British music television series
Video podcasts
Sky UK original programming
English-language television shows
2006 podcast debuts
2009 podcast endings
Music podcasts